Hollenbeck may refer to:

Places in the United States

Hollenbeck Middle School, Los Angeles, California
Hollenbeck Park, Boyle Heights, Los Angeles, California
LAPD Hollenbeck Division, part of Los Angeles Police Department, California
Hollenbeck Hall, listed on the National Register of Historic Places in Wapello County, Iowa

Other uses
Hollenbeck (surname)